Scintharista notabilis is a species of short-horned grasshopper in the family Acrididae. It is found in Africa, the Middle East, and South Asia.

It is common in rocky hills in the northern Dogon Country of Mali.

References

External links
 
 
 Names in Dogon languages, with images from Mali

Acrididae
Insects described in 1870
Orthoptera of Africa